The 2021–22 Minnesota Timberwolves season was the 33rd season of the franchise in the National Basketball Association (NBA). The regular season for the league began on October 19, 2021 and featured the normal 82-game schedule for the first time since the 2018–19 season. On September 22, 2021, general manager Gersson Rosas was fired, and was subsequently replaced by Sachin Gupta.

With a win over the Milwaukee Bucks on March 19, the Timberwolves clinched their first winning season since 2018, and only their second winning season since 2005. After a win over the Los Angeles Clippers in the Play-In Tournament on April 12, 2022, the Timberwolves clinched their first playoff berth since 2018. However, they lost to the Memphis Grizzlies in the first round in six games.

Previous season

The Timberwolves concluded the 2020–21 season with 23–49 record, finishing last in the Northwest Division and thirteenth in the Western Conference.

NBA Draft
 
Minnesota did not hold any picks in the 2021 NBA draft.

Roster

Standings

Division

Conference

Game log

Preseason

|-style="background:#cfc;"
| 1
| October 4
| New Orleans
| 
| D'Angelo Russell (19)
| Towns, Vanderbilt (7)
| Patrick Beverley (6)
| Target Center5,715
| 1–0
|-style="background:#cfc;"
| 2
| October 8
| @ Denver
| 
| Malik Beasley (13)
| Jarred Vanderbilt (8)
| D'Angelo Russell (6)
| Ball Arena11,927
| 2–0
|-style="background:#cfc;"
| 3
| October 11
| @ L.A. Clippers
| 
| D'Angelo Russell (19)
| Karl-Anthony Towns (9)
| D'Angelo Russell (9)
| Toyota Arena4,850
| 3–0
|-style="background:#fcc;"
| 4
| October 14
| @ Brooklyn
| 
| Anthony Edwards (23)
| Karl-Anthony Towns (8)
| Karl-Anthony Towns (6)
| Barclays Center11,210
| 3–1

Regular season

|-style="background:#cfc;"
| 1
| October 20
| Houston
| 
| Karl-Anthony Towns (30)
| Karl-Anthony Towns (10)
| D'Angelo Russell (7)
| Target Center16,079
| 1–0
|-style="background:#cfc;"
| 2
| October 23
| New Orleans
|  
| Karl-Anthony Towns (25)
| Anthony Edwards (9)
| Patrick Beverley (6)
| Target Center15,343
| 2–0
|-style="background:#fcc;"
| 3
| October 25
| New Orleans
| 
| Karl-Anthony Towns (32)
| Karl-Anthony Towns (14)  
| Karl-Anthony Towns (7)
| Target Center14,435
| 2–1
|-style="background:#cfc;"
| 4
| October 27
| @ Milwaukee
| 
| D'Angelo Russell (29)
| Jarred Vanderbilt (13)
| Patrick Beverley (7)
| Fiserv Forum17,341
| 3–1
|-style="background:#fcc;"
| 5
| October 30
| Denver
| 
| Malik Beasley (18)
| Anthony Edwards (11)
| D'Angelo Russell (6)
| Target Center17,136
| 3–2

|-style="background:#fcc;"
| 6
| November 1
| Orlando
| 
| Anthony Edwards (24)
| Karl-Anthony Towns (16)
| Karl-Anthony Towns (6)
| Target Center14,744
| 3–3
|-style="background:#fcc;"
| 7
| November 3
| L.A. Clippers
| 
| Anthony Edwards (28)
| Karl-Anthony Towns (11)
| Patrick Beverley (8)
| Target Center15,386
| 3–4
|-style="background:#fcc;"
| 8
| November 5
| L.A. Clippers
| 
| Karl-Anthony Towns (20)
| Towns, Vanderbilt (8)
| Jordan McLaughlin (5)
| Target Center17,136
| 3–5
|-style="background:#fcc;"
| 9
| November 7
| @ Memphis
| 
| Anthony Edwards (27)
| Karl-Anthony Towns (13)
| D'Angelo Russell (7)
| FedExForum12,416
| 3–6
|-style="background:#fcc;"
| 10
| November 10
| @ Golden State
| 
| Anthony Edwards (48)
| Karl-Anthony Towns (12)
| Beverley, Russell (7)
| Chase Center18,064
| 3–7
|-style="background:#cfc;"
| 11
| November 12
| @ L.A. Lakers
| 
| Karl-Anthony Towns (29)
| Beverley, Towns (7)
| D'Angelo Russell (7)
| Staples Center18,997
| 4–7
|-style="background:#fcc;"
| 12
| November 13
| @ L.A. Clippers
| 
| Anthony Edwards (21)
| Anthony Edwards (9)
| D'Angelo Russell (8)
| Staples Center15,285
| 4–8
|-style="background:#fcc;"
| 13
| November 15
| Phoenix
| 
| Karl-Anthony Towns (35)
| Karl-Anthony Towns (13)
| Anthony Edwards (6)
| Target Center16,279
| 4–9
|-style="background:#cfc;"
| 14
| November 17
| Sacramento
| 
| Karl-Anthony Towns (22)
| Jarred Vanderbilt (7)
| Beverley, Russell (7)
| Target Center13,108
| 5–9
|-style="background:#cfc;"
| 15
| November 18
| San Antonio
| 
| Karl-Anthony Towns (25)
| Towns, Vanderbilt (12)
| Anthony Edwards (6)
| Target Center13,572
| 6–9
|-style="background:#cfc;"
| 16
| November 20
| Memphis
| 
| D'Angelo Russell (28)
| Jarred Vanderbilt (10)
| D'Angelo Russell (5)
| Target Center17,136
| 7–9
|-style="background:#cfc;"
| 17
| November 22
| @ New Orleans
| 
| Karl-Anthony Towns (28)
| Karl-Anthony Towns (10)
| D'Angelo Russell (8)
| Smoothie King Center15,689
| 8–9
|-style="background:#cfc;"
| 18
| November 24
| Miami
| 
| Anthony Edwards (33)
| Jarred Vanderbilt (15)
| Edwards, Russell (6)
| Target Center17,136
| 9–9
|-style="background:#fcc;"
| 19
| November 26
| @ Charlotte
| 
| Karl-Anthony Towns (25)
| Jarred Vanderbilt (8)
| Karl-Anthony Towns (6)
| Spectrum Center19,314
| 9–10
|-style="background:#cfc;"
| 20
| November 27
| @ Philadelphia
| 
| Karl-Anthony Towns (28)
| Jarred Vanderbilt (14)
| D'Angelo Russell (8)
| Wells Fargo Center21,011
| 10–10
|-style="background:#cfc;"
| 21
| November 29
| Indiana
| 
| Karl-Anthony Towns (32)
| Anthony Edwards (9)
| D'Angelo Russell (11)
| Target Center14,191
| 11–10

|-style="background:#fcc;"
| 22
| December 1
| @ Washington
| 
| Karl-Anthony Towns (34)
| Karl-Anthony Towns (10)
| D'Angelo Russell (9)
| Capital One Arena15,318
| 11–11
|-style="background:#fcc;"
| 23
| December 3
| @ Brooklyn
| 
| D'Angelo Russell (21)
| Jarred Vanderbilt (15)
| D'Angelo Russell (11)
| Barclays Center17,732
| 11–12
|-style="background:#fcc;"
| 24
| December 6
| Atlanta
| 
| Karl-Anthony Towns (31)
| Karl-Anthony Towns (16)
| Anthony Edwards (7)
| Target Center15,736
| 11–13
|-style="background:#fcc;"
| 25
| December 8
| Utah
| 
| Karl-Anthony Towns (22)
| Karl-Anthony Towns (7)
| Edwards, Towns (5)
| Target Center15,181
| 11–14
|-style="background:#fcc;"
| 26
| December 10
| Cleveland
| 
| Karl-Anthony Towns (21)
| Jarred Vanderbilt (8)
| Patrick Beverley (7)
| Target Center15,694
| 11–15
|-style="background:#cfc;"
| 27
| December 12
| @ Portland
| 
| Anthony Edwards (24)
| Karl-Anthony Towns (10)
| D'Angelo Russell (5)
| Moda Center16,591
| 12–15
|-style="background:#cfc;"
| 28
| December 15
| @ Denver
| 
| Anthony Edwards (38)
| Russell, Vanderbilt (8)
| Patrick Beverley (8)
| Ball Arena15,365
| 13–15
|-style="background:#cfc;"
| 29
| December 17
| L.A. Lakers
| 
| Karl-Anthony Towns (28)
| Jarred Vanderbilt (16)
| Patrick Beverley (7) 
| Target Center17,136
| 14–15
|-style="background:#cfc;"
| 30
| December 19
| Dallas
| 
| Karl-Anthony Towns (24)
| Jarred Vanderbilt (10)
| Karl-Anthony Towns (6)
| Target Center16,127
| 15–15
|-style="background:#fcc;"
| 31
| December 21
| @ Dallas
| 
| Karl-Anthony Towns (26)
| Karl-Anthony Towns (14)
| D'Angelo Russell (12)
| American Airlines Center20,056
| 15–16
|-style="background:#fcc;"
| 32
| December 23
| @ Utah
| 
| Malik Beasley (33)
| Naz Reid (10)
| D'Angelo Russell (14)
| Vivint Arena18,306
| 15–17
|-style="background:#cfc;"
| 33
| December 27
| Boston
| 
| Jaylen Nowell (29)
| Nathan Knight (11)
| Jordan McLaughlin (10)
| Target Center15,962
| 16–17
|-style="background:#fcc;"
| 34
| December 28
| New York
| 
| Malik Beasley (20)
| Beverley, Knight (7)
| Patrick Beverley (7)
| Target Center16,339
| 16–18
|-style="background:#fcc;"
| 35
| December 31
| @ Utah
| 
| Anthony Edwards (26)
| Reid, Vanderbilt (7)
| Patrick Beverley (6)
| Vivint Arena18,306
| 16–19
|-

|-style="background:#fcc;"
| 36
| January 2
| @ L.A. Lakers
| 
| Naz Reid (23)
| Jarred Vanderbilt (12)
| Patrick Beverley (6)
| Crypto.com Arena18,343
| 16–20
|-style="background:#cfc;"
| 37
| January 3
| @ L.A. Clippers
| 
| Anthony Edwards (28)
| Jarred Vanderbilt (9)
| Patrick Beverley (12)
| Crypto.com Arena15,959
| 17–20
|-style="background:#cfc;"
| 38
| January 5
| Oklahoma City
| 
| Anthony Edwards (22)
| Karl-Anthony Towns (16)
| Patrick Beverley (6)
| Target Center14,375
| 18–20
|-style="background:#cfc;
| 39
| January 7
| @ Oklahoma City
| 
| D'Angelo Russell (27)
| Jarred Vanderbilt (16)
| D'Angelo Russell (12)
| Paycom Center14,874
| 19–20
|-style="background:#cfc;
| 40
| January 9
| @ Houston
| 
| Karl-Anthony Towns (40)
| Jarred Vanderbilt (19)
| D'Angelo Russell (10)
| Toyota Center15,277
| 20–20
|-style="background:#fcc;
| 41
| January 11
| @ New Orleans
| 
| Anthony Edwards (28)
| Karl-Anthony Towns (8)
| D'Angelo Russell (10)
| Smoothie King Center15,155
| 20–21
|-style="background:#fcc;
| 42
| January 13
| @ Memphis
| 
| Anthony Edwards (30)
| Jarred Vanderbilt (13)
| Beverley, Russell (6)
| FedEx Forum15,881
| 20–22
|-style="background:#cfc;
| 43
| January 16
| Golden State
| 
| Karl-Anthony Towns (26)
| Karl-Anthony Towns (11)
| D'Angelo Russell (12)
| Target Center17,136
| 21–22
|-style="background:#cfc;
| 44
| January 18
| @ New York
| 
| Anthony Edwards (21)
| Jarred Vanderbilt (7)
| Patrick Beverley (6)
| Madison Square Garden16,071
| 22–22
|-style="background:#fcc;
| 45
| January 19
| @ Atlanta
| 
| D'Angelo Russell (31)
| Karl-Anthony Towns (10)
| Karl-Anthony Towns (7)
| State Farm Arena15,199
| 22–23
|-style="background:#cfc;
| 46
| January 23
| Brooklyn
| 
| Anthony Edwards (25)
| Jarred Vanderbilt (9)
| D'Angelo Russell (10)
| Target Center16,475
| 23–23
|-style="background:#cfc;
| 47
| January 25
| @ Portland
| 
| Anthony Edwards (40)
| Karl-Anthony Towns (17)
| Jarred Vanderbilt (6) 
| Moda Center16,422
| 24–23
|-style="background:#fcc;
| 48
| January 27
| @ Golden State
| 
| Karl-Anthony Towns (31) 
| Karl-Anthony Towns (12)
| Edwards, Towns (6) 
| Chase Center18,064
| 24–24
|-style="background:#fcc;
| 49
| January 28
| @ Phoenix
| 
| Anthony Edwards (27)
| Karl-Anthony Towns (9)
| Anthony Edwards (10)
| Footprint Center17,071
| 24–25
|-style="background:#cfc;
| 50
| January 30
| Utah
|  
| Karl-Anthony Towns (31)
| Karl-Anthony Towns (11)
| Karl-Anthony Towns (10)
| Target Center10,407
| 25–25
|-

|- style="background:#cfc;
| 51
| February 1
| Denver
| 
| Karl-Anthony Towns (24)
| Karl-Anthony Towns (10)
| McLaughlin, Towns (7)
| Target Center15,839
| 26–25
|- style="background:#cfc;
| 52
| February 3
| @ Detroit
| 
| Anthony Edwards (25)
| Karl-Anthony Towns (14)
| Patrick Beverley (7)
| Little Caesars Arena15,523
| 27–25
|- style="background:#cfc;
| 53
| February 6
| Detroit
| 
| Karl-Anthony Towns (24)
| Karl-Anthony Towns (12)
| D'Angelo Russell (8)
| Target Center16,487
| 28–25
|- style="background:#cfc;
| 54
| February 8
| @ Sacramento
| 
| Karl-Anthony Towns (25)
| Jarred Vanderbilt (11)
| Jordan McLaughlin (11)
| Golden 1 Center12,409
| 29–25
|- style="background:#fcc;
| 55
| February 9
| @ Sacramento
| 
| D'Angelo Russell (29) 
| Jarred Vanderbilt (11)
| D'Angelo Russell (10) 
| Golden 1 Center12,527
| 29–26
|- style="background:#fcc;
| 56
| February 11
| @ Chicago
| 
| Anthony Edwards (31)
| Karl-Anthony Towns (8)
| Edwards, Towns (8)
| United Center20,092
| 29–27
|- style="background:#cfc;
| 57
| February 13
| @ Indiana
| 
| Anthony Edwards (37)
| Karl-Anthony Towns (13)
| D'Angelo Russell (6)
| Gainbridge Fieldhouse13,532
| 30–27
|- style="background:#cfc;
| 58
| February 15
| Charlotte
| 
| Karl-Anthony Towns (39)
| Karl-Anthony Towns (15)
| D'Angelo Russell (11)
| Target Center17,136
| 31–27
|-style="background:#fcc;
| 59
| February 16
| Toronto
| 
| Karl-Anthony Towns (24)
| Karl-Anthony Towns (11)
| D'Angelo Russell (7)
| Target Center15,982
| 31–28
|-style="background:#cfc;
| 60
| February 24
| Memphis
| 
| D'Angelo Russell (37)
| Jarred Vanderbilt (12)
| D'Angelo Russell (9)
| Target Center16,326
| 32–28
|-style="background:#fcc;
| 61
| February 25
| Philadelphia
| 
| Karl-Anthony Towns (25)
| Jarred Vanderbilt (8)
| Anthony Edwards (5)
| Target Center16,684
| 32–29
|-style="background:#cfc;
| 62
| February 28
| @ Cleveland
| 
| D'Angelo Russell (25)
| Jarred Vanderbilt (9)
| Jordan McLaughlin (7)
| Rocket Mortgage FieldHouse18,421
| 33–29
|-

|-style="background:#cfc;
| 63
| March 1
| Golden State
| 
| Karl-Anthony Towns (39)
| Karl-Anthony Towns (9)
| Beverley, Russell (7)
| Target Center17,136
| 34–29
|-style="background:#cfc;
| 64
| March 4
| @ Oklahoma City
|  
| Reid, Towns (20)
| Towns, Vanderbilt (8)
| Patrick Beverley (8)
| Paycom Center15,180
| 35–29
|-style="background:#cfc;
| 65
| March 5
| Portland
|  
| Karl-Anthony Towns (36)
| Karl-Anthony Towns (15)
| D'Angelo Russell (15)
| Target Center17,136
| 36–29
|-style="background:#cfc;
| 66
| March 7
| Portland
|  
| Karl-Anthony Towns (27)
| Karl-Anthony Towns (13)
| Patrick Beverley (7)
| Target Center16,035
| 37–29
|-style="background:#cfc;
| 67
| March 9
| Oklahoma City
|   
| Malik Beasley (33)
| Karl-Anthony Towns (11)
| D'Angelo Russell (12)
| Target Center16,191
| 38–29
|-style="background:#fcc;
| 68
| March 11
| @ Orlando
| 
| Anthony Edwards (25)
| Karl-Anthony Towns (13)
| D'Angelo Russell (7)
| Amway Center14,557
| 38–30
|-style="background:#cfc;
| 69
| March 12
| @ Miami
| 
| Jaylen Nowell (16)
| Reid, Towns (10)
| D'Angelo Russell (9)
| FTX Arena19,600
| 39–30
|-style="background:#cfc;
| 70
| March 14
| @ San Antonio
| 
| Karl-Anthony Towns (60)
| Karl-Anthony Towns (17)
| Patrick Beverley (8)
| AT&T Center14,143
| 40–30
|-style="background:#cfc;
| 71
| March 16
| L.A. Lakers
| 
| Karl-Anthony Towns (30)
| Jarred Vanderbilt (9)
| D'Angelo Russell (6)
| Target Center17,136
| 41–30
|-style="background:#cfc;
| 72
| March 19
| Milwaukee
| 
| Edwards, Towns (25)
| Karl-Anthony Towns (11)
| D'Angelo Russell (9)
| Target Center17,136
| 42–30
|-style="background:#fcc;
| 73
| March 21
| @ Dallas
| 
| Karl-Anthony Towns (22)
| Towns, Vanderbilt (8)
| Beverley, Rusell (4)
| American Airlines Center20,077
| 42–31
|-style="background:#fcc;
| 74
| March 23
| Phoenix
| 
| Anthony Edwards (19)
| Jarred Vanderbilt (12)
| D'Angelo Russell (7)
| Target Center17,136
| 42–32
|-style="background:#cfc;
| 75
| March 25
| Dallas
| 
| Karl-Anthony Towns (20)
| Karl-Anthony Towns (9)
| D'Angelo Russell (8) 
| Target Center17,136
| 43–32
|-style="background:#fcc;
| 76
| March 27
| @ Boston
| 
| Anthony Edwards (24)
| Anthony Edwards (5)
| Edwards, Russell (6)
| TD Garden19,156
| 43–33
|-style="background:#fcc;
| 77
| March 30
| @ Toronto
| 
| Anthony Edwards (24)
| Karl-Anthony Towns (10)
| Jordan McLaughlin (5)
| Scotiabank Arena19,800
| 43–34
|-

|-style="background:#cfc;
| 78
| April 1
| @ Denver
| 
| Karl-Anthony Towns (32)
| Karl-Anthony Towns (9)
| Anthony Edwards (7)
| Ball Arena19,612
| 44–34
|-style="background:#cfc;
| 79
| April 3
| @ Houston
| 
| Anthony Edwards (33)
| Karl-Anthony Towns (11)
| D'Angelo Russell (9)
| Toyota Center16,539
| 45–34
|-style="background:#fcc;
| 80
| April 5
| Washington
| 
| Karl-Anthony Towns (26)
| Karl-Anthony Towns (10)
| D'Angelo Russell (11)
| Target Center17,136
| 45–35
|-style="background:#cfc;
| 81
| April 7
| San Antonio
| 
| Anthony Edwards (49)
| Karl-Anthony Towns (13)
| Edwards, Beverley (8)
| Target Center17,136
| 46–35
|-style="background:#fcc;
| 82
| April 10
| Chicago
| 
| Nathan Knight (17)
|  Nathan Knight (8)
| Greg Monroe (5)
| Target Center17,136
| 46–36

Play-in

|- style="background:#cfc;"
| 1
| April 12
| LA Clippers
| 
| Anthony Edwards (30)
| Patrick Beverley (12)
| D'Angelo Russell (6)
| Target Center17,136
| 1–0

Playoffs

|- style="background:#cfc;"
| 1
| April 16
| @ Memphis
| 
| Anthony Edwards (36)
| Karl-Anthony Towns (13)
| D'Angelo Russell (9)
| FedExForum17,794
| 1–0
|- style="background:#fcc;"
| 2
| April 19
| @ Memphis
| 
| Anthony Edwards (20)
| Karl-Anthony Towns (11)
| Russell, Beverley, McLaughlin
| FedExForum17,794
| 1–1
|- style="background:#fcc;"
| 3
| April 21
| Memphis
| 
| D'Angelo Russell (22)
| Jarred Vanderbilt (13)
| D'Angelo Russell (8)
| Target Center19,364
| 1–2
|- style="background:#cfc;"
| 4
| April 23
| Memphis
| 
| Karl-Anthony Towns (33)
| Karl-Anthony Towns (14)
| D'Angelo Russell (7)
| Target Center19,832
| 2–2
|- style="background:#fcc;"
| 5
| April 26
| @ Memphis
| 
| Karl-Anthony Towns (28)
| Karl-Anthony Towns (12)
| D'Angelo Russell (8)
| FedExForum17,794
| 2–3
|- style="background:#fcc;"
| 6
| April 29
| Memphis
| 
| Anthony Edwards (30)
| Karl-Athony Towns (10)
| Anthony Edwards (5)
| Target Center20,323
| 2–4

Player statistics

Regular season

Transactions

Trades

Free agency

Additions

References

Minnesota Timberwolves seasons
Minnesota Timberwolves
2021 in sports in Minnesota
2022 in sports in Minnesota